Belt Line station is a DART station in Irving, Texas. The station opened in December 2012 and was the terminus of the Orange Line until the DFW Airport station opened on August 18, 2014.

References

External links 
Dallas Area Rapid Transit

Dallas Area Rapid Transit light rail stations
Railway stations in the United States opened in 2012
Dallas/Fort Worth International Airport
Railway stations in Dallas County, Texas
Transportation in Irving, Texas